Lisa Eckhart (born 6 September 1992) is an Austrian poetry slammer and cabaret artist.

Life 
Born in Leoben, Styria, Eckhart grew up near Leoben with her grandparents. After graduating from the HIB Liebenau in Graz in 2009, she studied German and Slavic Studies in Vienna and at the Paris Sorbonne. After a one-year stay in London, she moved to Berlin. She completed her master studies at the Free University of Berlin. The first master's thesis on femininity and National Socialism based on Joseph Goebbels's diaries was rejected, and her second master's thesis dealt with the figure of the devil in German literature. After graduating, she completed over twenty unsuccessful auditions at drama schools, often reciting Mephistopheles, and finally discovered poetry slam. In October 2015, she won the Austrian Poetry Slam Championships as the second woman. At the German Poetry Slam Championship 2015 in Augsburg competed with the later winner Jan Philipp Zymny.

In November 2015, she staged her cabaret solo debut at the Vienna Theater am Alsergrund. In 2015, she was one of five finalists on the Golden Miniature Nail. For her solo program, she was awarded the prize of the Austrian Cabaret Award.

In 2016 she was in Vereinsheim Schwabing in Bayerischer Rundfunk and as part of the advice team of What's new? as well as at STÖCKL. on ORF in 2017, she was a guest at Pufpaff's happy hour, at noon from 18 by Dieter Nuhr, on WDR in Mitternachtsspitzen and presented by Gerburg Jahnke and on ORF hosted by Hosea Ratschiller show Prater Stars.

On 10 January 2018, Eckhart started her second solo program with The Benefits of Vice (premiere in the Cabaret Niedermair). She calls herself "an angry, screaming Austrian rejected by art schools and loved by Germans who will never learn" and likes to wear eccentric outfits.

Bibliography
Stage Poetry
 2017: Metrische Taktlosigkeiten: Eine Einführung ins politische Korrektum. Schultz & Schirm Bühnenverlag, Wien, ISBN 978-3-9503907-6-6.
Novels
 2020: Omama. Paul Zsolnay Verlag, Wien, ISBN 978-3-552-07201-5.
 2022: Boum. Paul Zsolnay Verlag, Wien, ISBN 978-3-552-07307-4.

Awards 
 2015: Austrian Cabaret Award - Award for As if you had better things to do
 2017: Berliner Bär (B.Z. Culture Prize) - Poetry Slam Prize
 2017: Pantheon Prize - Jury Prize Early Rage & Corrupt
 2017: German Cabaret Prize - Sponsorship Award
 2018: Deutscher Kleinkunstpreis - Prize of the City of Mainz

References 

1992 births
Living people
Austrian cabaret performers
Slam poets
Austrian women poets